The Big Finish Short Trips are a collection of short story anthologies published by Big Finish Productions based on the BBC Television series Doctor Who, beginning with the collection Short Trips: Zodiac in December 2002 and ending with the loss of their license in 2009. The Short Trips name was inherited from similar collections published by the BBC, who decided in March 2000 that it was no longer financially viable to produce collections of short stories. Big Finish Productions negotiated a licence to continue producing these collections, publishing them in smaller runs and in hardback, thus allowing for a higher cover price and increased profit margins than on the BBC collections.

In May 2009 and after 28 collections, Big Finish announced that they were ending the Short Trips series as the BBC had not renewed it for a second licence, eventually halting sales of the books on the Big Finish Website in December 2009. Even so, the books are still available via off-site retailers and a final 29th volume collected the editor's favourite story of each of the previous volumes.

Books
The Big Finish Short Trips volumes are produced in a slightly different manner from their BBC predecessors: instead of being centrally produced, Big Finish commissions editors for the volumes, who in turn commission stories from writers for the themed collections. Because of this, each volume is produced depending on the working methods of its editor – some editors commission stories on invitation from writers, whilst others welcome unsolicited submission of stories. How the Doctor Changed My Life featured stories all written by previously unpublished authors. This was as a result of a competition, run by Big Finish in 2007, to seek out new talent.

Each collection is conceived around a single theme, with the individual stories exploring that theme:

The collections have mixed established Doctor Who writers from the television series, such as Ben Aaronovitch, Ian Briggs, Andrew Cartmel, Terrance Dicks, Glen McCoy, James Moran, Marc Platt, Helen Raynor and Eric Saward with writers who made their name in other Doctor Who spin-off ranges, such as Paul Cornell, Joseph Lidster, Kate Orman, Lance Parkin, Philip Purser-Hallard, Gareth Roberts, Gary Russell and Robert Shearman, and writers from other literary spheres, including Dan Abnett, Lou Anders, Scott Andrews, Jonathan Clements, Peter David, Richard Dinnick, Keith R.A. DeCandido, Brian Dooley, Diane Duane, Nev Fountain, Lizzie Hopley, Todd McCaffrey, Juliet E. McKenna, Paul Magrs, James Moran, Gary Owen, Stel Pavlou, Steven Savile, James Swallow and Matthew Sweet.

Audio
On 31 December 2009, Big Finish lost their license to produce or sell their short story anthology book series Short Trips. On 10 February 2010 Big Finish announced that the range would be relaunched as double CD audiobooks featuring eight new short stories each. The stories were to be read by popular Doctor Who actors. Also on this day Big Finish asked for short story submissions, from anyone who hadn't written for them before, for possible inclusion on the CDs. Soon after the closing date it was announced that they had received 500 entries and that Colin Baker would be among the actors reading the stories, as well as writing the Sixth Doctor story for Volume 1. After four volumes, this series was discontinued, but the range was relaunched yet again as a monthly download-only series in 2015. The person in brackets in the "Featuring" column is who the story is read by.

Single Short Trips (2009–21)
The releases listed below were single releases made available by Big Finish as subscriber and magazine exclusives and podcasts. Starting from September 2016, Big Finish is releasing these exclusives to general customers under the banner, Short Trips Rarities. There will be at least a two-year delay between a story's subscriber exclusive release and its wider general release, in order to still keep these an incentive to subscribers of the main range.

Paul Spragg Memorial Short Trips (2016–present) 
The annual Paul Spragg Memorial Short Trip will continue to be released individually.

Volume 1 (2010)

Volume 2 (2011)

Volume 3 (2011)

Volume 4 (2011)

Series 5 (2015)

Series 6 (2016)

Series 7 (2017)

Series 8 (2018)

Series 9 (2019)

Series 10 (2020)

Volume 11 (2022) 
In November 2020, it was announced that the Short Trips range would return to the audio anthology format. It consists of 6 episodes.

Volume 12 (2023)

External links
 Big Finish's Short Trips page
 Outpost Gallifrey's reviews page
 Interview with range editor, Ian Farrington

References

 
Novels based on Doctor Who
Audio plays based on Doctor Who
Big Finish Productions
Doctor Who spin-offs
Book series introduced in 2002